62nd Regiment or 62nd Infantry Regiment may refer to:

 62nd (Shawinigan) Field Regiment, Royal Canadian Artillery, a unit of the Canadian Army 
 62nd Field Artillery Regiment, RCA, a unit of the Canadian Army 
 62nd Reserve Artillery Regiment (Ireland), a unit of the Irish Reserve Defence Force
 62nd Regiment of Foot (disambiguation), three units of the British Army have had this name
 62nd Infantry Regiment (United States), a unit of the US Army
 62nd Air Defense Artillery Regiment, a unit of the US Army

American Civil War
Union (Northern) Army
 62nd Illinois Volunteer Infantry Regiment 
 62nd New York Volunteer Infantry Regiment 
 62nd Indiana Infantry Regiment
 62nd Ohio Infantry
 62nd Pennsylvania Infantry
 62nd Regiment Massachusetts Volunteer Infantry

Confederate (Southern) Army
 62nd Virginia Mounted Infantry
 62nd Tennessee Infantry